Entre Lagos is the main town of Puyehue commune in Osorno Province of Los Lagos Region, Chile. It is the only town of any size on the lake.

Due to Entre Lagos's location between Puyehue Lake to the north and Rupanco Lake to the south, the town takes its name from its geographical position between the lakes (in Latin inter lacus). It was originally known as "El Desague" and had a ferry that ran the length of the lake to the Termas de Puyehue resort area.

See also
Interlaken
Interlagos
List of towns in Chile

References

External links

Entre Lagos - OpenStreetMap
Entre Lagos - Google Maps

Populated lakeshore places in Chile
Populated places in Osorno Province